Roman Skorniakov (born 17 February 1976, in Sverdlovsk) is a Russian-born figure skater who mainly represented Uzbekistan. He represented Russia early in his career before switching to Uzbekistan in 1996. Skorniakov is the 1997–2003 Uzbekistani national champion. He represented Uzbekistan at the 1998 and 2002 Winter Olympics, twice placing 19th. His highest placement at an ISU Championship was 7th at the 2000 and 2002 Four Continents Championships.

Skorniakov married Tatiana Malinina in January 2000. Their son, Ilia Malinin (born in 2004), is a competitive figure skater for the United States. Their daughter was born in 2014.

Skorniakov and Malinina coached each other during the later part of their careers after the death of former coach Igor Ksenofontov.

Skorniakov works as a skating coach in Reston, Virginia.

Programs

Results

References

External links
 

Russian male single skaters
Uzbekistani male single skaters
Olympic figure skaters of Uzbekistan
Figure skaters at the 1998 Winter Olympics
Figure skaters at the 2002 Winter Olympics
1976 births
Living people
Sportspeople from Yekaterinburg
Asian Games medalists in figure skating
Figure skaters at the 1999 Asian Winter Games
Medalists at the 1999 Asian Winter Games
Asian Games silver medalists for Uzbekistan
People from Dale City, Virginia